Liolaemus scolaroi is a species of lizard in the family Iguanidae.  It is from Chile and Argentina.

References

scolaroi
Lizards of South America
Reptiles of Chile
Reptiles of Argentina
Reptiles described in 2005